Binaki or pintos is a type of steamed corn sweet tamales from two regions in the Philippines – Bukidnon and Bogo, Cebu. They are distinctively wrapped in corn husks and are commonly sold as pasalubong and street food in Northern Mindanao and Cebu. It is sometimes anglicized as "steamed corn cakes".

Description
Binaki and pintos are sweet variants of Philippine tamales without fillings. They arose independently in Bukidnon and Bogo. Both are traditionally wrapped in corn husks, but can usually be distinguished from each other by the method of wrapping. Binaki has a longer and narrower wrapping, while pintos is shorter and rectangular with additional cross-wise ties.

Binaki and pintos are prepared identically. They are made by scraping young corn ears on a grater. The resulting coarse cornmeal is then mixed with coconut milk (or milk), margarine (butter), baking powder, and white or brown sugar. In lieu of coconut milk and sugar, condensed milk may sometimes be used. Cheese may also be added, though it is rare. The mixture is then scooped and wrapped in corn husk before being steamed until firm.

Variants
However, it has diverged greatly and is generally considered a separate dish. It uses grated cassava primarily, with only bits of grated young corn kernels mixed in. It is sold wrapped in banana leaves like suman, although it can also be wrapped in corn husk.

See also

 Binatog
 Cornbread
 List of maize dishes
 Maíz con hielo
 Tamal

References

External links

Philippine desserts
Maize dishes
Street food
Foods containing coconut